The 1963 Rutgers Scarlet Knights football team was an American football team that represented Rutgers University in the 1963 NCAA University Division football season. Despite an overall losing record, Rutgers won the Middle Three Conference championship.

In their fourth season under head coach John F. Bateman, the Scarlet Knights compiled a 3–6 record and were outscored by their opponents 148 to 145. The team's statistical leaders included Dave Stout with 634 passing yards, Don Viggiano with 404 rushing yards, and Paul Strelick with 242 receiving yards.

The Scarlet Knights played their home games at Rutgers Stadium in Piscataway, New Jersey, near the university's main New Brunswick campus.

Schedule

References

Rutgers
Rutgers Scarlet Knights football seasons
Rutgers Scarlet Knights football